Autoroute 5 may refer to:
 A5 autoroute, in France
 Quebec Autoroute 5, in Quebec, Canada

See also 
 A5 road
 List of A5 roads
 List of highways numbered 5